Kumhari is a city located in the Indian state of Chhattisgarh. It comes under the Durg district. It is situated at 21°27'N 81°52' and has an average elevation of 284 meters above the sea level.

Kumhari is located in Dhamdha tehsil of Durg district in the Indian state of Chhattisgarh. Kumhari is a Nagar Palika Parishad and situated at Durg district and Raipur district border beside Karun River.

The nearest city to Kumhari in Durg is Bhilai. It is situated at a distance of 5.5 nm towards the west of the Kumhari city. Raipur, the capital city of the state is located towards the east of this Chhattisgarh city. Kumhari's distance from Raipur is about 6.8 nm. The other nearby towns are Jamul and Banbarad situated towards the west of the Kumhari city of Durg. While its distance from the town of Jamul is 6.6 nm, Banbarad is situated 9 nm away from the city of Kumhari. Towards the north of the Kumhari city are the towns of Dharsinwa and Kusmi situated at a distance of 11.7 nm and 15 nm respectively. The city of Patan is situated 14 nm away towards the south of Kumhari, Chhattisgarh. 

The nearest airport to this Chhattisgarh city is the one located in [Raipur] Swami Vivekanand airport.

Geography
It has an average elevation of 285 metres (935 feet).
Area: 36.9 km2
Density: 949.7 inh./km2 [2011] – Change: +1.65%/year [2001 → 2011]

Demographics
Kumhari is divided into 24 wards. Kumhari municipal corporation had controlled Kumhari town and also controlled 5 villages named Kugda, Rampur, Janjgiri, Parsada, Pahanda.  India census,  Kumhari had a population of 45000. Males constitute 52% of the population and females 48%. Kumhari has an average literacy rate of 63%, higher than the national average of 59.5%: male literacy is 71%, and female literacy is 54%. In Kumhari, 16% of the population is under 6 years of age.

Places of interest
Kevalya Dham: Jain temple of white marble is on NH 6 and is a place of tourist attraction. Kevalya Dham is a popular Jain tourist pilgrim attraction located in Kumhari town. The temple is also known as Sri Adinath Jain Shwetambar Tirth collection of 26 small and big Jain temples magnificently built with marbles. The temple enshrines the idols of all 24 Tirthankars in small temples with one large temple complex with idol of Rishabhdev. On the corner wall within the shrine carries a detailed description of Sri Shatrunjay Maha Tirtha.

Mahamaya Temple: There is an old temple of goddess Mahamaya.The beautiful Maa Mahamaya Devi Mandir in Kumhari town is another popular religious attraction. Tourists and devotees from near and far off places visit this temple to offer prayers and seek goddess Mahamaya's blessings.
Kharun River: Kharun River is a tributary of Shivnath river that empties into Mahanadi river.
Sai Dham: Sai dham is shridi sai baba temple located at NH 6 Kumhari.
Durga Maidan Durga Maidan situated in badi colony or ward no 15 has many new things to explore around. There is sahni mandir and during navratri many across charoda and in radius of kumhari come here to play garba and dandiya and many competition are being held in area.

Educational areas
In Kumhari multiple schools and colleges are present which provide quality education in town.

List of schools:
Govt. Higher Secondary School Kumhari
Bharti Vidyalaya Kumhari
Vidya Jyoti English Medium Higher Secondary School Kumhari
Mansarowar School Janjgiri
Vishva Vedanta School Kumhari
Vichakshan Vidyapeeth Near Kevalaya Dham, Kumhari
 Vidya Deep Public School, Kumhari
 Jyoti Hr. Sec. Eng. Med. school, Charoda

List of colleges:
 Sandipany Academy, Achhoti, Kumhari-Ahiwara Road
Shri Rawatpura Sarkar Pharmacy College
Shri Rawatpura Sarkar B.Ed college
ICFAI University

Industries
Kumhari has different types of industries which provides employment to peoples of nearby areas and deals in timber products, steel, iron, coal, liquor and much more.

Some major Industries are:
Kontinental Steel & Power Limited
Kedia Castle Industries Limited
Shukla Timber Mart
Ayush Timber Company
Vikas Timber Traders
Umesh kumar & Brothers
Yugbodh digital printing
Bharatgas Agency
Shiv Shankar Industries
Geeta Hardware
Trade, Mark, Plazza Business Center Kumhari
Agrawal Complex

References

External links
 Durg Government
 Chhattisgarh Government
 Latest News of Kumhari

Cities and towns in Durg district